Stefan Nadelman is an American film director and animator.

A collection of photos from Stefan Nadelman's film Terminal Bar was released in book form in 2014, authored by Nadelman and his father Sheldon Nadelman who also was the book's photographer, entitled, Terminal Bar: A Photographic Record of New York's Most Notorious Watering Hole. Nadelman also directed the animated music video for the song "I Say Fever" by Ramona Falls.

Short filmography
(2000) Latin Alive
(2002) Terminal Bar
(2006) Food Fight
(2015) Last Call
(2015) Waveform

References

External links

Director's Notes 2008 podcast interview with Stefan Nadelman.
Videology-tv.com Interview with Stefan Nadelman.

Living people
Iowa State University alumni
American animators
American animated film directors
Year of birth missing (living people)